Hon. Samuel Nartey George (born 22 January 1985) is a Ghanaian politician. He is from Ahwiam, Old Ningo.  He is a member of the National Democratic Congress. In November 2015, he defeated the incumbent E. T. Mensah to represent the party in the 2016 parliamentary elections for Ningo-Prampram Constituency. He is currently a member of the Seventh Parliament of the Fourth Republic of Ghana representing Ningo-Prampram constituency.

Early life and education 
Sam Nartey George was born on 22 January 1985 in Somanya in the Eastern Region of Ghana. He obtained a BSc. in Agricultural Engineering (Soil & Water Engineering) from KNUST and an L.L.B from the University of London. He has an Executive Masters (Dissertation) (Conflict, Peace, and Security) from the Kofi Anann International Peacekeeping and Training Center(KAIPTC). In December 2022, he graduated with an MSc in International Strategy and Diplomacy from the London School of Economics and Political Science.

Career 
Sam Nartey George was the assistant director at the Office of the Head of Civil Service from 2010 to 2014 and a communications specialist at the office of the President from 2014 to 2016.

Politics

Elections 
Sam George on 21 November 2015 toppled the incumbent Member of Parliament for Ningo-Prampram Hon. Enoch Teye Mensah (MP since 1996-2015) in the NDC primaries for a chance to represent the party in the 2016 parliamentary elections. He won with 4,910 votes representing 53.4% of total votes whiles E. T. Mensah polled 2,831 representing 38.5%.

In the 2020 election, George was declared winner of the Ningo-Prampram Constituency parliamentary Elections by polling 23, 860 votes representing 63% to defeat his closest contender, Mr. Sylvester Tetteh of the NPP, who polled 13, 588 votes.

Parliamentary committees 
Sam George is currently a member of both the Public Accounts Committee and the Communications Committee.

Ideology 
Sam George holds anti-LGBTI views and has described homosexuality as a "perversion". In 2021, together with other Members of Parliament he proposed a law criminalizing homosexuality and many forms of LGBTI support and activism, even medical support. The draft has been widely criticized by human rights activists for its "cruelty".

Personal life 
Sam George is a Christian.

References

1985 births
Living people
National Democratic Congress (Ghana) politicians
Ghanaian MPs 2021–2025
Kwame Nkrumah University of Science and Technology alumni
Alumni of the University of London